Han Xinyun and Junri Namigata were the defending champions, but Namigata chose not to participate . Han partnered Katarzyna Piter , but lost in the quarterfinals to Tammi Patterson and Olivia Rogowska .

You Xiaodi and Zhu Lin won the title, defeating top seeds Nadiia Kichenok and Mandy Minella in the final 2–6, 7–5, [10–7] .

Seeds

Draw

References 
 Draw

Launceston Tennis International - Doubles